The Martha's Vineyard Mysteries is a television film series which airs on Hallmark Movies & Mysteries channel.

The films star Jesse Metcalfe and Sarah Lind and are filmed in the USA and Canada. They are based on the novels by Philip R. Craig and the first aired in 2020.  The author's son, a sergeant in the Edgartown Police Department, helps the production team ensure the stories are as realistic as possible.

Series overview
The series centers around a retired Boston detective (Metcalfe) when he returns to his hometown in Massachusetts and becomes involved in various criminal investigations, and his relationship with the local doctor and medical examiner (Lind).  There is a recurring subplot around the circumstances of Jackson's retirement from Boston after being shot and injured while working a case with his partner.

Cast and characters
 Jeff Jackson (Jesse Metcalfe) is a retired detective.
 Zee Madieras (Sarah Lind) is a doctor and medical examiner.
 Chief Madieras (Eric Keenleyside) is the chief of police, and Zee's father.
 Jackie Shawl (Chelsea Hobbs) is a local reporter.
 Britt Prajna (Sunita Prasad) is a local hotel manager and Zee's best friend.

List of films

References 

Entertainment Studios films
American mystery drama films
Hallmark Channel original films
Martha's Vineyard in fiction
2020 television films
2021 television films
American drama television films
2020s English-language films